Khuan Niang railway station is a railway station located in Rattaphum Subdistrict, Khuan Niang District, Songkhla.

Services 
 Rapid No. 169/170 Bangkok-Yala-Bangkok
 Local No. 445/446 Chumphon-Hat Yai Junction-Chumphon
 Local No. 447/448 Surat Thani-Sungai Kolok-Surat Thani
 Local No. 451/452 Nakhon Si Thammarat-Sungai Kolok-Nakhon Si Thammarat
 Local No. 455/456 Nakhon Si Thammarat-Yala-Nakhon Si Thammarat
 Local No. 463/464 Phatthalung-Sungai Kolok-Phatthalung

References 
 
 

Railway stations in Thailand
Buildings and structures in Songkhla province